Team Outer Banks is the first team registered from North Carolina to complete the Worrell 1000 sailboat race from Ft. Lauderdale, Florida to Virginia Beach, Virginia.  Team Outer Banks competed and completed the event four years in a row from 1999 through 2002.  

In 2022 - After Twenty (20) Years - Team Outer Banks would once again compete in and COMPLETE its FIFTH WORRELL 1000 - Making it Five-for-Five in the Event.

History
1999 - Skippered by John McLaughlin, from Baltimore and crewed by Robert 'P-Nut' Johnson of Kill Devil Hills, North Carolina.  The team was one of 15 teams to compete in 1999 and they finished seventh overall.  Johnson sustained an injury to his right hand during the event as was replaced by ground crew member Charles Thuman. Thuman climbed aboard at the Myrtle Beach stop and completed the remainder of the race.

2000 - Again skippered by John McLaughlin and crewed by Robert 'P-Nut' Johnson, the two were able to complete the entire course and finished eleventh out of twenty-three original entrants.  In 2000, there were only fifteen teams of the twenty-three that completed all twelve legs and 1000 miles from Lauderdale to Virginia Beach.

2001 - John McLaughlin was back for his third year and sailed with Charles Thuman.  During what was one of the worst days in Worrell 1000 history - at the start of the Jensen Beach leg to Cocoa Beach - Team Outer Banks was one of only five boats able to negotiate the surfline and sail to the next checkpoint. All of the other teams were forced to break their boats down and trailer them to the next stop, re-assemble and wait for another day.  McLaughlin and Thuman eventually completed the entire course but finished eighth overall after it was announced that those boats that did not sail the Jenson–Cocoa leg would be penalized just two hours.

2002 - John McLaughlin came back for his fourth and final attempt with crew Rick Parsley.  The two were able to once again complete the entire event - making it four-for-four for Team Outer Banks.

2003 - The team did not enter into the 2003 event - wary of the financial issues that were constantly surrounding the Worrell - the team declined to forward the $5,000 entry fee that year and thus avoided being one of 36 teams that were scheduled to compete when the race was canceled due to sponsorship difficulties.

2022 - After a Twenty (20) Year hiatus - Team Outer Banks was the FIRST to register/enter into the 2022 event.  Skippered by Hardy Peters with Crew James Eaton, both from Southern Shores, NC - Team Outer Banks was once again able to complete the entire course [with the exception of the 'Trailer Leg' from Cocoa Beach to Daytona] making it Five-for-Five for the North Carolina based team.  Twelve of the thirteen teams to enter the race, completed the entire course in 2022.

Sailors
 John McLaughlin - Skipper (1999, 2000, 2001, 2002)
 Robert 'P-Nut' Johnson - Crew (1999, 2000)
 Charles Thuman - Crew (2000, 2001)
 Rick Parsley - Crew (2002)
 Hardy Peters - Skipper (2022)
 James Eaton - Crew (2022)

Ground crew
 Charles Thuman (1999, 2000, 2001)
 Billy Mosley (1999, 2000, 2001)
 Brian Blackford (2001)
 Matthew J. Byrne - Pusher (1999, 2000, 2001, 2002) [Limited 2022]
 Michael P. O'Brien (1999, 2000, 2001, 2002)
 Mark Widener (2002)
 Robert Peters [Hardy's Son] (2022)
 Ben Wilson (2022)

Team managers
 Matthew & Robin Byrne (1999, 2000, 2001, 2002)
 Michael & Nancy O'Brien (1999, 2000, 2001, 2002)
 April Peters (2022)

Sponsors
 Awful Arthur's Restaurant (1999, 2000, 2001, 2002)
 Coastal Chevrolet (1999, 2000, 2001)
 Outer Banks Tourism Board (2000) (2022)
 Griggs Lumber Company (1999, 2000, 2001)
 The East Carolina Bank (1999, 2000, 2001)
 Quagmires on the Beach (1999, 2000, 2001, 2002)
 East Coast Sailboats (2022)
 Just for the Beach Rentals, Inc. (2022)
 Nor'Banks Sailing & Watersports (2022)
 Bonzer Shack (2022)
 Gray Berryman Outer Banks Real Estate (2022)

References

External links
 Worrell 1000

Sailing teams